The White Guardian is a character in the long-running British science fiction television series Doctor Who. He was played by Cyril Luckham, with the exception of a vocal message in The Stones of Blood which was performed by Gerald Cross.

The White Guardian is an anthropomorphic personification of order and the counterpart of the Black Guardian who represents evil, chaos and entropy. The two Guardians balance out the forces in the universe, although the Black Guardian seems to desire to upset the balance in favour of chaos and evil while the White Guardian prefers to maintain the status quo. The Guardians both appeared in Season 16 of the programme, where all six serials of that season were linked together in the quest for the Key to Time, an artifact of immense power that would give the wielder supreme power over all existence.

The White Guardian had concerns that the universe was descending into chaos. As a result, he asked the Doctor to find and assemble the Key to Time so that he might restore the balance of the universe. The Doctor was successful in this task, but the Black Guardian disguised himself as the White and tried to deceive the Doctor into handing the key over to him instead. The Doctor saw through the Black Guardian's ruse - due to the Guardian's lack of concern for Astra of Atrios, who was literally the sixth segment; the White Guardian would never have been so callous about the fate of a sentient being - and ordered the key to disperse, though he commented afterwards that the White Guardian should have been able to carry out his work while the key was assembled.

The Guardian next appeared briefly during Enlightenment, the conclusion of the Black Guardian Trilogy, a story arc in which the evil Guardian attempted to force Turlough to kill the Doctor. The White Guardian appeared to the Doctor to warn him and, with the Black Guardian, to offer the prize of "Enlightenment" to the winner of a solar sail boat race across the Solar System.

Other appearances
In the BBC Books spin-off novel The Quantum Archangel by Craig Hinton, the White Guardian appears briefly with the Black Guardian and four others, who form a Council of Guardians that oversee reality. Although extremely powerful, the Guardians apparently cannot be seen to act directly, which is why they can only affect things through agents like the Doctor. The other four Guardians were first mentioned in Divided Loyalties by Gary Russell, which states that one of them is the Celestial Toymaker.

The White Guardian returns in the Big Finish audio dramas The Destroyer of Delights and The Chaos Pool. Once again, The Key to Time is being sought, but this time with the Fifth Doctor and a sentient Tracer named Amy. The White Guardian is played by Jason Watkins, and is portrayed as rapidly losing his powers due to the decay of the six segments of the Key.

References

External links

Television characters introduced in 1978
Recurring characters in Doctor Who
Male characters in television